John Berridge McCuish (June 22, 1906 – March 12, 1962) was the 34th governor of Kansas, briefly serving in 1957 after two years as the 32nd lieutenant governor of Kansas. He was a member of the Republican Party.

Biography
McCuish was born in Leadville, Colorado, and attended Kemper Military School in Boonville, Missouri, before graduating from Washburn University in Topeka, Kansas, in 1925. He married Cora E. Hedrick on September 9, 1925.

Career
McCuish began his journalism career as a newspaper-advertising salesman. He became owner and editor of the Hillsboro Star and returned to Newton, Kansas and owned and edited the Harvey County News from 1930 to 1958. He was a delegate to the Republican National Convention in 1936.

McCuish entered the U. S. Army to serve in World War II as a private and participated in the Anzio landings. He also aided the American Red Cross in Germany. After returning from Germany, McCuish held several positions with the Kansas Republican Party including being a delegate to the Republican National Convention in 1948.

Elected Lieutenant Governor of Kansas, McCuish began his term in 1954 under Governor Fred Hall. Governor Hall, who had been defeated for renomination in 1956, resigned on January 3, 1957, eleven days before the inauguration of his successor, Democrat George Docking. McCuish became governor of Kansas for those eleven days, making his administration the shortest in the history of the state. His one official act as governor was to appoint Hall to the State Supreme Court, in what is known as "the triple play of 1956," as a way of denying Docking the opportunity to appoint the new chief justice. While this "triple play" was perfectly legal, many considered it to be unethical.

After leaving office, McCuish returned to the newspaper business, but continued to be politically active. After becoming an independent oil operator, he sold his newspaper and devoted his time to the oil business.

Death
McCuish died after suffering a stroke and is interred at Greenwood Cemetery in Newton, Kansas.

References

External links
National Governor's Association Bio
 
Kansapedia
The Political Graveyard

 

Republican Party governors of Kansas
Lieutenant Governors of Kansas
Washburn University alumni
United States Army personnel of World War II
1906 births
1962 deaths
People from Leadville, Colorado
American Presbyterians
20th-century American politicians
United States Army soldiers
American Red Cross personnel